Thornhill, also known as the Hade–Lewis House, is a plantation in Talladega County, Alabama, built beginning in 1835 by planter John Hardie. Hardie was an immigrant from Scotland, arriving in the Alabama Territory in 1818 after first spending time in New York and Virginia. The topology of the land reminded Hardie of his father's Thorn Hill Farm in Kinross, Scotland, so he named the property Thornhill. Cotton was the primary crop grown at Thornhill with about 50 enslaved people being held at the plantation by Hardie.

The property includes the Classical Revival house, a chapel, the servants' quarters, the plantation office, a barn, a horse racetrack and the family cemetery, along with the approach road. The main house is an I-house in plan, one room deep in front, two stories, with a rear ell. The facade is five bays wide and fronted by a central portico. The interior has a central hall plan, flanked by a parlor, a dining room and a library in the ell. A kitchen occupies the farther reaches of the ell.

Thornhill was listed on the National Register of Historic Places on February 20, 1998.

References

External links

Houses on the National Register of Historic Places in Alabama
Greek Revival architecture in Alabama
Houses completed in 1835
Historic American Buildings Survey in Alabama
National Register of Historic Places in Talladega County, Alabama
Plantation houses in Alabama
Plantations in Alabama